{|

{{Infobox ship career
|Hide header=
|Ship country=
|Ship flag= 
|Ship name= Mamilossa
|Ship namesake=Abenaki for it walks from the shore onto the water
|Ship operator=Canadian Coast Guard
|Ship registry=Ottawa, Ontario
|Ship ordered=
|Ship awarded=
|Ship builder=Hoverworks Limited, Cowes, England
|Ship original cost=
|Ship yard number=833290
|Ship way number=
|Ship laid down=
|Ship launched=2009
|Ship sponsor=
|Ship christened=
|Ship completed= 
|Ship acquired=
|Ship commissioned=
|Ship decommissioned=
|Ship in service=2009-present
|Ship out of service=
|Ship renamed=
|Ship reclassified=
|Ship refit=
|Ship struck=
|Ship reinstated=
|Ship homeport=CCG Hovercraft Base Trois-Rivières - Quebec Region
|Ship identification=*
Callsign: CFN5305
|Ship motto=  
|Ship nickname=
|Ship honours=
|Ship fate= 
|Ship status=
|Ship notes=
|Ship badge=
}}

|}
CCGS Mamilossa is a Canadian Coast Guard Hoverwork AP1-88/400 Air Cushioned Vehicle or hovercraft based at CCG Hovercraft Base Trois-Rivières, QC. The hovercraft was their first built in the UK, the CCGS Sipu Muin and CCGS Siyay were built under license by Hike Metal Products of Wheatley, Ontario, Canada. She is the largest hovercraft exported by British shipbuilders.

The primary missions of Mamilossa'' is used for SAR along coastlines in Quebec Region, but can perform other tasks:

 navigation aid
 buoy tender

The hovercraft's name is Abenaki for "it walks from the shore onto the water fair winds".

See also

List of other Canadian Coast Guard hovercraft:

 CCGS Moytel
 CCGS Penac
 CCGS Sipu Muin
 CCGS Siyay

References

External links
 Canadian Coast Guard Fleet in Quebec
 Griffon Hoverwork News
 CCG PDF On CCGS Mamilossa

Mamilossa
Ships built on the Isle of Wight
2009 ships
Ships of the Canadian Coast Guard